The shooting of Barry "Gene" Deloatch occurred on the early morning of September 22, 2011 in New Brunswick, New Jersey. Deloatch, an unarmed man, was shot twice and killed by police. Officers later claimed he attempted to hit them with a wooden stick. The circumstances of his death generated significant controversy, leading to a series of high-profile resident protests and an investigation by the Middlesex County Prosecutor. In 2016, the city reached an agreement with the sons of Deloatch in the wrongful death civil suit they filed; the settlement was in the amount of $300,000.

Background
Deloatch worked at New Brunswick High School as security officer and maintenance staff.  He was planning to marry his long-time girlfriend in January 2012. Deloatch was convicted of two drug offenses in New Brunswick in the past decade.

The incident
Officers approached Deloatch and two other men around 12:12 AM near the intersection of Throop Avenue and Handy Street.  Deloatch fled into a nearby alley and two police officers followed.  He fled by crawling under a fence, and Officer Mazan attempted to follow him through the fence while Officer Berdel attempted to go around a nearby house to approach from the other side. Officer Mazan became entrapped and unable to access his weapons. According to officers, Deloatch began to hit Officer Mazan in the head with a stick, and failed to follow Officer Berdel's orders to stop attacking the officer. He was shot twice in the side.  Deloatch had no firearm, but after the incident occurred, radio recordings state "the suspect was attempting to hit us with a wooden stick".  Deloatch was pronounced dead at Robert Wood Johnson Hospital at 12:37 AM.

The officers
According to court papers, Brad Berdel was the shooter, and his partner was Dan Mazan.  The two were subject of nine internal affairs investigations over their careers, with allegations ranging from "demeanor complaints" to "excessive force", and one complaint of "differential treatment" came from a fellow police officer.  The two of them were also involved in 10 use-of-force incidents in 2010 (above the department average of five), with 80 percent of them involving black or Latino men.  Berdel was one of very few officers to have kicking, uses of chemical spray and use of hands or fists cited in complaints.

Protests
The community response began with a protest of about 100 people outside City Hall the day following the shooting.  Protests continued on a daily basis, including marches down George Street that disrupted commuter traffic.

Support to the protestors has come from national civil rights organizations such as the National Action Network and NAACP.  The Latino Leadership Alliance has requested to present the case before grand jury.  Al Sharpton called for the ACLU to investigate.

Deloatch's funeral was held on October 8, and it was marked an additional "Day of Outrage" protest.  On October 24, another major protest was held at Feaster park.

Aftermath
Mayor Cahill held a public forum on police-community relations.  The NBPD agreed to some internal affairs reforms.

The two police officers involved were placed on administrative leave, and ultimately a Middlesex County grand jury declined to charge either officer.  Brad Berdel resigned in August 2012 due to three departmental violations.

In 2016, New Brunswick and Deloatch's family reached an agreement on a settlement of $300,000 for the death of Deloatch.

See also
 Police brutality in the United States

References

Year of birth missing
2011 deaths
New Brunswick, New Jersey
Deaths by firearm in New Jersey
Law enforcement in New Jersey 
Police brutality in the United States
Crimes in New Jersey
People shot dead by law enforcement officers in the United States